Rhagium morrisonense is a species of beetle in the family Cerambycidae. It was described by Kano in 1933.

References

Lepturinae
Beetles described in 1933